Tomas Walsh (born 1 March 1992) is a New Zealand athlete who competes mainly in the shot put. He is the current national record holder both outdoors and indoors for the event.

Walsh was the bronze medallist at the 2014 IAAF World Indoor Championships, the silver medallist at the 2014 Commonwealth Games, 4th at the 2015 World Championships in Athletics, winner of the 2016 IAAF World Indoor Championships, the bronze medallist at the 2016 Summer Olympics, the gold medallist at the 2017 World Championships and the bronze medallist at the 2019 World Championships, 2022 World Athletics Indoor Championships and the 2020 Summer Olympics, and gold medallist at the 2022 Commonwealth Games.

Athletics career
Walsh made his international debut at the 2009 World Youth Championships in Athletics, where he placed sixth in his shot put speciality and also competed in the qualifying of the discus throw. On 12 December 2009 Walsh recorded a put of  the 5 kg shot to win the Senior Boys title at the New Zealand National Secondary School Track and Field Championships. This performance was a New Zealand Youth (Under 18) record which was broken the following day by Jacko Gill when winning the Junior Boys (Under 16) title.

At the 2010 World Junior Championships in Athletics Walsh failed to qualify for the final of the shot put which was won by Gill.

In 2012 Walsh won his first senior national shot put title which he retained the following season and also added the discus title.

At the 2014 IAAF World Indoor Championships, in his first senior international competition and first ever competition indoors, Walsh finished third in the men's shot put.

In the final, Walsh won the silver medal behind O'Dayne Richards.

Walsh finished fourth at the 2015 World Championships on 23 August in Beijing, throwing a new personal best of 21.58m. He was just 11 cm off the bronze medal. He improved his personal best to 21.62m on 8 September in winning the shot put at the Hanžeković Memorial in Zagreb. On 11 September Walsh won his first Diamond League meet with a throw of 21.39m in Brussels.

In the 2016 World Indoor Championships, Walsh won the gold medal with a throw of 21.78m, breaking his own New Zealand national and Oceania area indoor records three times in the process. He went on to take the bronze medal at the Rio de Janeiro Olympic Games, with 21.36m, and the following year won the 2017 IAAF World Championships with 22.03m.

Walsh retained his World Indoor title at the 2018 World Indoor Championships, with a then personal best of 22.31m. He surpassed this with 22.67m on 25 March the same year, at the Sir Graeme Douglas International Track Challenge in West Auckland, New Zealand, moving him into the top-10 World All-Time.

At the 2018 Commonwealth Games in Gold Coast, Australia, Walsh threw 22.45m, setting a new Commonwealth Games record en route to qualify for the Shot Put Men's final.

In 2019, Walsh threw 22.90m in the first round of the 2019 World Athletics Championships to set a new Oceanian record. He finished in third place.

At the 2020 Summer Olympics in Tokyo, Walsh took third place once again, with a throw of 22.47m. At the 2022 World Athletics Indoor Championships, Walsh equalled his own indoor Oceanian record.

Personal life
Walsh works part-time as a builder in Timaru.

Tom's father, Peter, won the New Zealand junior men's shot put in the 1964–65 season and was a member of the 1974 South Canterbury Rugby side that won the Ranfurly Shield.

Statistics

Personal bests
Outdoor
Shot put –  Doha (2019)   
Discus throw –  (2014)

Indoor
Shot put –  (2018, 2022)

Shot put season's best
Senior implement weight (7.26 kg) only.

Competition record

National titles
Shot put: 2012, 2013, 2014, 2015, 2016, 2017, 2018, 2019, 2020
Discus throw: 2013

Notes

References

External links

 
 
 
 
 
 
 

|-

|-

1992 births
Living people
New Zealand male shot putters
Olympic male shot putters
Olympic athletes of New Zealand
Olympic bronze medalists for New Zealand
Olympic bronze medalists in athletics (track and field)
Athletes (track and field) at the 2016 Summer Olympics
Medalists at the 2016 Summer Olympics
Athletes (track and field) at the 2020 Summer Olympics
Medalists at the 2020 Summer Olympics
Commonwealth Games competitors for New Zealand
Commonwealth Games gold medallists for New Zealand
Commonwealth Games silver medallists for New Zealand
Commonwealth Games medallists in athletics
Commonwealth Games gold medallists in athletics
Athletes (track and field) at the 2014 Commonwealth Games
Athletes (track and field) at the 2018 Commonwealth Games
Athletes (track and field) at the 2022 Commonwealth Games
World Athletics Championships athletes for New Zealand
World Athletics Championships medalists
World Athletics Championships winners
World Athletics Indoor Championships winners
Diamond League winners
Australian Athletics Championships winners
People educated at Timaru Boys' High School
Sportspeople from Timaru
20th-century New Zealand people
21st-century New Zealand people
Medallists at the 2018 Commonwealth Games
Medallists at the 2022 Commonwealth Games